David López Moreno (born 10 September 1982) is a Spanish professional footballer who plays for UD Caravaca as a midfielder.

He amassed La Liga totals of 196 matches and 23 goals over eight seasons, for Osasuna (three years) and Athletic Bilbao (five). He also spent two years in the English Championship with Brighton & Hove Albion.

Club career

Osasuna
López was born in Logroño, La Rioja. A product of CA Osasuna's youth ranks, he made his first-team – and La Liga – debut on 17 October 2004 in a 3–2 home win against Albacete Balompié, and finished his first season with 13 games and one goal, scored in his first appearance.

The following campaign, López was an undisputed starter as the Navarrese side achieved a first-ever qualification for the UEFA Champions League. The player contributed six goals to this feat, including a crucial one in the last matchday, a 2–1 home victory over Valencia CF.

As Osasuna were relegated to the UEFA Cup, López appeared 11 in matches in the team's semi-finals run, netting in 3–0 away defeats of Parma FC (twice) and Bayer 04 Leverkusen.

Athletic Bilbao
In summer 2007, López signed with neighbours Athletic Bilbao for around €6 million. His competitive debut was on 28 August in a 0–0 home draw against his former team, and he was first-choice in his first two years, totalling 60 league matches; in his second he helped the Basques to narrowly avoid relegation, scoring at Recreativo de Huelva (1–1), and at home against Sporting de Gijón (3–0) and Racing de Santander (2–1, through a penalty).

López netted six goals from 28 appearances in 2010–11 to match the highest total in his career, but he became a fringe player for the Lions after the arrival of Argentine Marcelo Bielsa as club manager. On 31 August 2012, his contract with Athletic was rescinded by mutual consent.

Brighton & Hove Albion
Immediately after being released, López transferred to Brighton & Hove Albion in the Championship, signing a one-year contract. During his spell at the Falmer Stadium, he was nicknamed 'Spanish Dave'.

Later years
After leaving England at the age of 32, López spent three full seasons in his country's Segunda División, first with CD Lugo and then SD Huesca. Subsequently, he took his game to the lower leagues.

Honours
Athletic Bilbao
Copa del Rey runner-up: 2008–09, 2011–12
Supercopa de España runner-up: 2009
UEFA Europa League runner-up: 2011–12

References

External links

1982 births
Living people
Sportspeople from Logroño
Spanish footballers
Footballers from La Rioja (Spain)
Association football midfielders
La Liga players
Segunda División players
Segunda División B players
Tercera División players
Tercera Federación players
Divisiones Regionales de Fútbol players
CA Osasuna B players
CA Osasuna players
Athletic Bilbao footballers
CD Lugo players
SD Huesca footballers
UCAM Murcia CF players
Novelda CF players
CF Intercity players
CD Eldense footballers
English Football League players
Brighton & Hove Albion F.C. players
Spanish expatriate footballers
Expatriate footballers in England
Spanish expatriate sportspeople in England